David Peel may refer to:

* David Peel (actor) (1920–1981), British film actor
 David Peel (musician) (1942–2017), New York underground rock musician